Ablain-Saint-Nazaire is a commune in the Pas-de-Calais department in northern France.

Geography
A farming village located 8 miles (12 km) north of Arras, on the D57 road. It was rebuilt after being destroyed during World War I. The Saint-Nazaire stream, which passes through the commune, is a small tributary of the river Deûle.

Population

History
At the start of World War I, the Battle of Lorette lasted for 12 months, from October 1914 to October 1915, resulting in high casualties on both sides: 100,000 killed and as many wounded.
A French national cemetery was built on 13 hectares nearby and comprises 20,000 graves, laid out irrespective of rank or military training. General Barbot has a private soldier buried next to him, on his right.
In eight ossuaries, around the base of the lantern tower, are the remains of 22,970 unidentified soldiers. A portion of the cemetery has been reserved for Muslim soldiers.

In 2014, to mark the centenary of the start of World War I, French President François Hollande and German defence minister Ursula von der Leyen inaugurated a memorial for Armistice Day.

Sights
 The church of St. Pierre, dating from the twentieth century.
 The ruins of the fifteenth century church, destroyed in World War I.
 The war museum.

See also
 Communes of the Pas-de-Calais department

References

External links

 The Communauté d'Agglomération of Lens-Liévin 
 Official website of Ablain-Saint-Nazaire 

Communes of Pas-de-Calais
Artois